Philip James Elson (born 23 May 1981) is an English professional golfer.

Elson was born in Leamington Spa, England. He attended Augusta State University in the U.S. and turned professional in 2003.

Elson played on the Challenge Tour in 2003, winning once at the Volvo Finnish Open. He played on the top-tier European Tour in 2004, but was unsuccessful and disappeared from both Tours for a number of years. In 2009, he made a comeback, and once again qualified for the European Tour via Qualifying School. His second season at the highest level was more successful, with a best finish of tied for second at the Saint-Omer Open, but he still only retained partial membership for the following season. However, he started 2011 strongly, recording two top-5 finishes before matching his best ever result with a tied for second at the Madeira Islands Open.

His father, Pip Elson, was also a successful professional golfer.

Professional wins (2)

Challenge Tour wins (1)

MENA Tour wins (1)

Results in major championships

Note: Elson only played in The Open Championship.
CUT = missed the half-way cut

Team appearances
Amateur
European Boys' Team Championship (representing England): 1998
European Youths' Team Championship (representing England): 2000 (winners), 2002
Palmer Cup (representing Great Britain and Ireland): 2000 (winners), 2001
European Amateur Team Championship (representing England): 2001
Walker Cup (representing Great Britain and Ireland): 2001 (winners)
Eisenhower Trophy (representing England): 2002
St Andrews Trophy (representing Great Britain & Ireland): 2002 (winners)

See also
2009 European Tour Qualifying School graduates
2011 European Tour Qualifying School graduates

References

External links

English male golfers
European Tour golfers
Augusta Jaguars men's golfers
Sportspeople from Leamington Spa
Sportspeople from Chertsey
1981 births
Living people